Thorbjorn Thorsteinsson (Old Norse: Þórbjörn klerkr Þórsteinnson), also known as Thorbjorn the Clerk, was a pirate from the Orkney Islands who was executed in 1158.

Thorbjorn was married to the sister of Sweyn Asleifsson, but they first quarrelled after Sweyn attacked Thorbjorn's cousin, Olvir Rosta, and grandmother, Frakkok, and burned her to death inside her house. Earl Rognvald Kali Kolsson forced a reconciliation, and the two went plundering together in the Hebrides, but fell out again over the distribution of the loot. Thorbjorn had his marriage annulled and entered Rognvald's service.

Later, serving Harald Maddadsson, Thorbjorn found himself again thrown into Sweyn's company.

In 1158, Thorbjorn was outlawed by Rognvald for murdering one of his retainers. He placed his faith in his friendship with Harald, but the two Earls had recently become allies, and Thorbjorn was in a very dangerous position. He attempted to resolve it by ambushing and assassinating Ranald; but Harald had him put to death.

References

1158 deaths
12th-century executions by Norway
Executed Scottish people
Scandinavian Scotland
Orkneyinga saga characters
People executed by the Earldom of Orkney
Scottish pirates
Year of birth unknown
Medieval pirates
People from Orkney